Darwaza Bandh Rakho ( Keep the Door Shut) is an Indian Hindi-language comedy film directed by J. D. Chakravarthy, cinematography by Chota K. Naidu and released in 2006. The film was remade in Telugu in 2011 as Money Money, More Money, with J.D. Chakravarthy playing the lead role and in Kannada as 5 Idiots.

Synopsis
Four small-time crooks, played by Aftab Shivdasani, Chunky Pandey, Zakir Hussain and Snehal Dabi, turn towards kidnapping for some quick money. They kidnap a millionaire's daughter, played by Isha Sharvani, and they demand money (1 crore). They are forced to barge into the home of a vegetarian Gujarati family of 35. The head of the household is played by Ishrat Ali.

Their stay in the house gets extended when they learn that the hostage's father has gone abroad and they have to wait until he returns. The kidnappers are forced to take more hostages to keep their identity secret and prevent the kidnapping venture from failing. Eventually other people are stuck in the house, such as: Mughale Azam (pizza guy), Gunpat Kale (police constable), Julie (Manisha Koirala, a sales girl), Sharad Shetty (guy who wants money from Kantilal shah), Munish Mehta (real estate guy). What follows is a "mad-mad comedy of errors".

Taneja finally appears he gives the four kidnappers the money, however there is now a fight between the four, and then Taneja calls the police. The kidnappers go to the court, Isha says Ajay Goga Raghu are innocent but not Abbas. After 16 months Ajay owns a hotel and works with Mughale Azam, Isha and Ajay are both friends, Julie works with Raghu on the sales business, Goga owns a sweet shop, Ganpat Kale is not a policeman but police driver, Abbaas goes to jail, and the Shah residence live happily ever after.

Cast
 Aftab Shivdasani...Ajay 'Balu' Pandit 
Chunky Pandey...Raghuveer 'Raghu' Achrekar 
Zakir Hussain...Mohammad Abbas Ali
 Aditya Srivastav... Inspector
 Snehal Dabi...Govind 'Goga' Gawde / Narrator 
Isha Sharvani...Isha Taneja 
Manisha Koirala...Julie - CISCO Salesgirl 
Ishrat Ali...Kantilal Shantilal Shah 
Gulshan Grover...Taneja
Tashu Kaushik...Sheeba K. Shah
Ravi Kale...Havaldar Ganpat Kale 
Divya Dutta...Chameli G. Kale
Goga Kapoor...Manish Mehta - Real Estate Agent 
Nitin Raikwar...Madhusudan 'Mugaleazam' - Pizza Boy 
Anupam Shyam...Police Inspector
Srinivasa Rao Kota...Dr. Mukala Umapathi Kutti 
Pramod Moutho...Dinesh Duggal - Secretary
Raju Mavani...Mushtaqbhai Pathan 
Javed Rizvi...Arvind S. Shetty 
Padma Rani...Mrs. Shah 'Ba' 
Vijay Shah...Ponky K. Shah

Soundtrack

Reviews
The movie was tagged as a "thrilling comedy"; other reviewers regarded it as an innovative theme that "ran out of steam" midway into the plot. The performance was regarded as "lackluster", Acting was mediocre and people who watched said that the actors tried "too hard" to make people laugh but failed miserably. The movie was box office failure.

References

External links
 

2000s Hindi-language films
2006 films
Indian black comedy films
Hindi films remade in other languages
2006 comedy films